Kurumkansky District (Khuramkhaanai aimag) is an administrative and municipal district (raion), one of the twenty-one in the Republic of Buryatia, Russia. It is located in the northeast of the republic. Its administrative center is the rural locality (a selo) of Kurumkan. As of the 2010 Census, the total population of the district was 15,007, with the population of Kurumkan accounting for 36.4% of that number.

History
The district was established on December 11, 1970.

Administrative and municipal status
Within the framework of administrative divisions, Kurumkansky District is one of the twenty-one in the Republic of Buryatia. The district is divided into five selsoviets and four somons, which comprise twenty-eight rural localities. As a municipal division, the district is incorporated as Kurumkansky Municipal District. Its five selsoviets and four somons are incorporated as ten rural settlements within the municipal district. The selo of Kurumkan serves as the administrative center of both the administrative and municipal district.

Demographics
As of the 2010 Census the ethnic breakdown of Kurumkansky District was the following:Buryats: 65.04%
Russians: 30.07%Evenks: 2.03%Tatars: 0.08%Ukrainians: 0.01%Belarusians: 0.01%Azerbaijanis: 0.01%Others: 0.05%

References

Notes

Sources

Districts of Buryatia
States and territories established in 1970
1970 establishments in Russia
 
